Hugh and I is a black-and-white British sitcom that aired from 1962 to 1967. It starred Terry Scott and Hugh Lloyd as two friends who shared lodgings with Terry's mother and was followed by a sequel called Hugh and I Spy. The two actors had previously worked together on stage for many years.

Hugh and I was written by John T. Chapman with additional material from John Junkin. Music was by Wally Stott. The first five series were produced by David Croft. 68 episodes were produced over 6 series, as well as two short special episodes as part of the BBC's Christmas Night with the Stars programme in 1963 and 1964 respectively.

Cast
Terry Scott – Himself
Hugh Lloyd – Himself
Vi Stevens – Mrs Scott (series 1 to 5)
Wallas Eaton – Arthur Crispin (series 1 to 5)
Mollie Sugden – Ethel Crispin (series 1 to 5)
Jill Curzon – Norma Crispin (series 1 to 2, 4)
Jacqueline Wallis – Norma Crispin (series 3)
Wendy Richard – Norma Crispin (series 5)  
Cyril Smith – Harold Wormold (series 1)
Jack Haig – Cecil Wormold (series 2 to 5)
Patricia Hayes – Griselda Wormold (series 1 to 5)

Plot
Terry Scott is a lovable rogue who wants to achieve wealth without working. The cunning Terry lives with his mother at 33, Lobelia Avenue in Tooting, South London. They have a gullible and dull-witted lodger, Hugh Lloyd, who works at a local aircraft factory. The two often try to make money through one of Scott's get-rich-quick schemes. Their next door neighbours, the Crispins and the Wormolds, also make frequent appearances. Mr Crispin is a thug who thinks violence will solve a problem, Mrs Crispin is a snob and their daughter Norma is constantly being stalked by men. On the other side, the Wormolds are an old couple; Harold is very clumsy. In the last episode of the fifth series, Hugh won £5,000 on the Premium Bonds and the following series showed the two of them undertaking a world cruise. The neighbours and mother had left the show.

Archive Status 
Only 28 episodes are thought to survive: (see wiping).

In November 2016, an episode of the sixth series (S6 Ep3 'Beau Jesters') was returned after many years believed lost. In July 2017 the episode 'The Girl on the Poster' was returned by BBC South producer and presenter Richard Latto. In December 2021 two episodes of the fifth series (S5 Ep9 'It's In The Stars' and S5 Ep10 'Huntin' Shootin' and Fishin') were recovered by Kaleidoscope, having been purchased from a private collector on eBay.

Episodes
All episodes from the first, fifth and sixth series were 30 minutes, while episodes from the other series were 25 minutes long. The surviving 25/30-minute episodes are indicated by their archive status, as are the two Christmas Night With the Stars specials.

Series 1 (1962)

Series 2 (1963)

Christmas Special (1963)

Series 3 (1964)

Christmas Special (1964)

Series 4 (1965)

Series 5 (1966)

Series 6 (1966-7)

Radio
A single episode of Hugh and I was adapted for radio by the BBC and was broadcast on 13 June 1963.

DVD release
24 (of the 28) surviving episodes of the series, were released on DVD by Renown Films on 7 September 2015, currently excluding the most recently rediscovered (S6 Ep3 'Beau Jesters', S3 Ep9 'The Girl on the Poster', S5 Ep 9 'It's in the Stars' & S5 Ep 10 'Huntin', Shootin' and Fishin').

References

Mark Lewisohn, "Radio Times Guide to TV Comedy", BBC Worldwide Ltd, 2003
Hugh and I at British TV Comedy

External links 
 

1962 British television series debuts
1967 British television series endings
1960s British sitcoms
BBC television sitcoms
David Croft sitcoms
Lost BBC episodes
Television shows set in London